James Kerr House is a historic plantation house located near Kerr, Sampson County, North Carolina.   The house was built in 1844, and is a -story, five bay by two bay, Greek Revival style frame dwelling.  It has a gable roof, -story rear ell, brick pier foundation, and a pillared double-tier porch central porch. The interior is center-hall in plan. The house is attributed to builder Isaac B. Kelly, who also built the Dr. John B. Seavey House. Also on the property are the contributing original detached kitchen and frame smokehouse.

It was added to the National Register of Historic Places in 1986.

References

Plantation houses in North Carolina
Houses on the National Register of Historic Places in North Carolina
Greek Revival houses in North Carolina
Houses completed in 1844
Houses in Sampson County, North Carolina
National Register of Historic Places in Sampson County, North Carolina